Hymenoptychis phryganidalis is a moth in the family Crambidae. It was described by Pagenstecher in 1886. It is found in Indonesia, where it has been recorded from the Aru Islands.

References

Moths described in 1886
Spilomelinae